Melchior Barthel (born 10 December 1625 in Dresden; died there 12 November 1672) was a German sculptor.

Biography
He studied with his father and with Johann Boehme, of Schneeberg (1640–45), and settled at Dresden, where he was appointed sculptor to the court.

Works
His principal works are the colossal tomb of the Doge Giovanni Pesaro (Santa Maria dei Frari, Venice); the statue of John the Baptist (chapel of Santa Maria, Nazareth); and a tomb in San Giovanni e Paolo, Venice. His numerous ivory carvings in the Green Vault at Dresden are considered superior to his more elaborate works.

Notes

1625 births
1672 deaths
German sculptors
German male sculptors
Artists from Dresden